is a 1949 Japanese science fiction tokusatsu film directed by Nobuo Adachi, with special effects by Eiji Tsuburaya. The film was loosely based on H. G. Wells' 1897 The Invisible Man and produced by Daiei Film, the film stars Kanji Koshiba, Chizuru Kitagawa, Takiko Mizunoe, Daijirō Natsukawa, Ryūnosuke Tsukigata, and Kichijiro Ueda.

Plot 

A gang of thugs intend to use an invisibility formula created by Professor Nakazato to rob a priceless jewel necklace "The Tears of Amour."

Cast
Kanji Koshiba as Shunji Kurokawa, the Invisible Man
Chizuru Kitagawa as Machiko Nakazato
Takiko Mizunoe as Ryuko Mizuki
Ryūnosuke Tsukigata as Kenzo Nakazato
Daijirō Natsukawa as Kyosuke Segi
Kichijiro Ueda as Otoharu Sugimoto
Shosaku Sugiyama as Ichiro Kawabe
Mitsusaburo Ramon as Matsubara, lead investigator

Themes 
The Invisible Man Appears was influenced by exposure to American films during the Allied Occupation of Japan following World War II.

Production
The film was initially tentatively titled Invisible Demon by Hisashi Okuda. According to Okuda, When he showed the plan to Eiji Tsuburaya, who had just been expelled from public office, Tsuburaya promised, "I am willing to cooperate because I believe this is worth considering."

Release
The Invisible Man Appears was released in Japan on 26 September 1949. The film and its follow-up were never released outside of Japan until Arrow Video released the film on Blu-ray March 15, 2021.

Follow-up 

Daiei produced a second film inspired by H. G. Wells' The Invisible Man novel, titled , which was released to Japanese theaters on August 25, 1957.

References

External links

The Invisible Man Appears at the Japanese Movie Database

1949 films
Japanese crime films
1940s science fiction films
Japanese science fiction films
Films about invisibility
Films shot in Kyoto
Daiei Film tokusatsu films
Daiei Film films